Michael Müller (born 28 October 1944) is a German former footballer who played as a midfielder.

References

External links
 Profile on kicker.de
 Profile on DFB.de

1944 births
Living people
German footballers
Association football midfielders
Wacker 04 Berlin players
2. Bundesliga players